Chen Chunxin (born 25 December 1997) is a Chinese footballer currently playing as a right winger for Shanghai Port.

Career statistics

Club
.

References

1997 births
Living people
Chinese footballers
China youth international footballers
Association football forwards
Shanghai Port F.C. players